This is a list of flag bearers who have represented Nigeria at the Olympics.

Flag bearers carry the national flag of their country at the opening ceremony of the Olympic Games.

See also
Nigeria at the Olympics

Notes

References

Nigeria at the Olympics
Nigeria
Olympic flagbearers
Olympic flagbearers